Belinda Leong is an American pastry chef who is the co-founder and owner of b. Patisserie in San Francisco.

Leong began her culinary career with an internship at Michael Mina's Aqua Restaurant and enrolled in the Hospitality and Restaurant Program at San Francisco City College. After graduating in 1999, she joined Gary Danko, becoming the pastry chef there in 2001.

After eight years at Gary Danko, Leong sought more experience in Europe, staging with Pierre Hermé in Paris, with Carles Mampel at Bubó, Martín Berasategui at Lasarte, René Redzepi at Noma, and at In De Wulf in Belgium. After two years in Europe, she returned to the Bay Area to become the pastry chef at Manresa.

In 2013, Leong partnered with Michel Suas of the San Francisco Baking Institute to open b. Patisserie in San Francisco. Her Kouign-amann became a favorite among customers and received praise from national publications.

Leong was nominated for James Beard Foundation Awards for Outstanding Pastry Chef in 2014, and Outstanding Baker in 2015, 2016, and 2017. In 2018, she won the James Beard Award for Outstanding Baker along with her partner, Michel Suas.

References

Living people
American women chefs
Pastry chefs
James Beard Foundation Award winners
Year of birth missing (living people)
21st-century American women